Portrait of a Lone Farmer is a 2013 Nigerian Danish documentary film by Jide Tom Akinleminu, about life on his father's chicken farm in Nigeria.

References

External links

Nigerian documentary films
Best Documentary Africa Movie Academy Award winners
Danish documentary films
2013 films
2013 documentary films
Documentary films about agriculture
Agriculture in Nigeria